Adam Ellis (born 21 March 1996) is a British grasstrack and motorcycle speedway rider and former British champion.

Biography

Born in Marmande, France, Ellis began grasstrack racing in 2009, going on to finish second in the 250cc French Grasstrack Championship in 2010, and winning the championship in 2011. In 2012 he again finished runner up, and also competed in the French Speedway Championship. He was mentored by former rider Matt Read. He also began speedway racing in the United Kingdom, winning two rounds of the British Junior Championship. He was signed by the National League team Isle of Wight Islanders as their number eight, averaging 7.61 from eight matches, and also became a Lakeside Hammers asset, making his Elite League debut in October. After the end of the 2012 season he was confirmed in the Islanders team for 2013, as well as getting a place in the Ipswich Witches Premier League team and an Elite League contract with Lakeside Hammers.

In May 2013 he was selected to compete in the World Under-21 speedway semi-final in Lonigo. In 2017 he was made an asset by Swindon Robins along with Zach Wajtknecht. In 2019 he won the SGP Premiership with Robins for the second time.

Ellis became the British champion in 2021 after winning the 2021 British Speedway Championship. In 2022, he rode for the Sheffield Tigers in the SGB Premiership 2022 and for the Birmingham Brummies in the SGB Championship 2022. He helped Sheffield win the League cup and reach the Play off final.

In 2023, he re-signed for Sheffield for the SGB Premiership 2023.

World Longtrack Championship Team Championship
 2018 -  Morizes 5/46pts (with James Shanes, Zach Wajtknecht & Chris Harris) Second

References

1996 births
Living people
British speedway riders
Birmingham Brummies riders
Eastbourne Eagles riders
Ipswich Witches riders
Isle of Wight Islanders riders
Lakeside Hammers riders
Sheffield Tigers riders